La Rinconada is a village of municipality Casas de Lázaro in Albacete, Castile-La Mancha, Spain. 

Populated places in the Province of Albacete